Zulkiffli Hassim (born March 26, 1986) is a Singaporean professional footballer who currently plays for Yishun Sentek Mariners. He plays as a forward.

Career

Gombak United
Zulkiffli played for Woodlands Wellington and Gombak United reserve teams in the Prime League in his early days. In late 2009, Zulkiffli was called up to play for the Bulls' first team in the S.League and became a regular in 2010 and 2011.

Balestier Khalsa
However, as Gombak United had plans to sit out of the S.League from 2013 onwards due to lack of financial resources, Zulkiffli joined Balestier Khalsa in 2012 and has remained with the Tigers since then.

Zulkiffli suffered one of his grey periods in the footballing career as he was handed a five-match ban and a suspended fine for making offensive remarks against Woodlands Wellington defender Fabien Lewis. Zulkiffli had clashed with Lewis when their respective teams met at Toa Payoh Stadium for a S.League fixture on 18 March 2012, which ended 2-0 in favour of the Tigers. It was concluded that Hassim made “remarks of an offensive and racist nature” to Lewis, a Trinidadian of African descent.

Yishun Sentek Mariners FC
He signed for Yishun Sentek Mariners FC after being released by the Tigers.

Honours
Balestier Khalsa
 Singapore Cup: 2014
 League Cup: 2013

Yishun Sentek Mariners
 National Football League Division 1: 2017

References

1986 births
Living people
Singaporean footballers
Association football forwards
Woodlands Wellington FC players
Gombak United FC players
Balestier Khalsa FC players
Singapore Premier League players